Rhynchephestia is a monotypic moth genus of the family Pyralidae described by George Hampson in 1930. Its single species, Rhynchephestia rhabdotis, described by the same author in the same year, is endemic to the Hawaiian island of Maui.

The larvae feed on Argyroxiphium sandwicense macrocephalum. They feed in the flower heads, destroying the seeds. In the seasons when there are no flowers they feed in the stem and among or at the bases of the leaves which are densely crowded together. The larvae are subject to a fungus which kills a large proportion of them.

External links

Phycitinae
Endemic moths of Hawaii
Monotypic moth genera
Pyralidae genera